The Launière River is a tributary of the Jacques-Cartier River, flowing in the La Côte-de-Beaupré Regional County Municipality, in the administrative region of the Capitale-Nationale, in the province of Quebec, in Canada.

This watercourse is located in the south center of the Laurentides Wildlife Reserve. This valley is indirectly accessible by the Antonio-Talbot road. Secondary forest roads serve the sector for forestry and recreational tourism activities.

The surface of the Launière River (except the rapids zones) is usually frozen from the end of November to the beginning of April, however the safe circulation on the ice is generally done from mid-December to the end of March.

Geography 

The main watersheds neighboring the Launière river are:
 north side: ruisseau de l'Enfer, Rivière aux Écorces North-East, Chicoutimi River;
 east side: Jacques-Cartier River, Jacques-Cartier Lake, rivière du Milieu;
 south side: Jacques-Cartier River, Rocheuse River;
 west side: lac Champlain, Cavée River, le rivière aux Écorces.

The Launière River rises at the mouth of Honorine Lake. This lake is mainly fed by the outlet (coming from the northeast) of lakes Bert and Mongeau, as well as an unidentified stream (coming from the southeast). A dam was built at its mouth which is located northwest of the lake, at:
 southwest of the course of the Chicoutimi River;
 south of Lac Vézina which is the head lake of the Rivière aux Écorces North-East;
 west of the route 175;
 north-east of Jacques-Cartier Lake;
 north of its mouth (confluence with the Jacques-Cartier River).

Upper course of the Launière river (from its source) (segment of )

 west passing between two mountains, up to the west shore of Lac Jeanne;
Note: a forest road passes over this dam;
 first to the south, then to the east, crossing Lac Launière over its full length, to its mouth. Note: Lac Launière receives on the east side the outlet of Lac La Giroflée and on the west side the outlet of Lake Frazie;

Intermediate course of the Launière river (segment of )

 to the south, in particular by crossing Lac du Renflement over its full length, to the dam at its mouth;
 to the south, crossing two series of rapids, up to a bend in the river, corresponding to the outlet (coming from the west) of Lac du Huard;
 south in a deep valley, crossing a few series of rapids at the end of the segment, to a stream (from the west);
Lower Launière River ( segment)

Lower course of the Launière river (segment of )

 south crossing several series of rapids and passing under the forest road bridge to the outlet (coming from the west) of Frank Lake;
 to the southeast by collecting the outlet (coming from the west) from Lac Dorothy, to the confluence of the Rivière du Milieu (Rivière Launière);
 towards the south-east in a deep valley and forming a small curve towards the north-east to go around a mountain, to its mouth.

The current of the Launière river flows on the north bank of the Jacques-Cartier River, in a bend of the river.

Toponymy 
The toponym "Lac Launière" appears on a map of the Laurentides National Park (1954).

The toponym "Rivière Launière" was formalized on December 5, 1968, at the Place Names Bank of the Commission de toponymie du Québec.

See also 
 Launière Lake, a body of water
 List of rivers of Quebec

References

External links 
 Official site of the Laurentides Wildlife Reserve

Rivers of Capitale-Nationale
La Côte-de-Beaupré Regional County Municipality